Jandaia do Sul is a municipality in the state of Paraná in Brazil.  As of 2020, the estimated population was 21,230.

References

Jandaia do Sul